The Wee Kirk o' the Heather was a wedding chapel in Las Vegas, Nevada. It opened in 1940, making it the first wedding chapel in Las Vegas.

It was parodied as the Wee Kirk Of Auld Lang Syne in Evelyn Waugh's The Loved One.

It is mentioned in Thomas Pynchon's 2009 novel Inherent Vice (pg. 246).

The chapel was demolished October 3, 2020.

See also 
List of wedding chapels in Las Vegas

References

External links
 

Churches in Nevada
Wedding chapels in the Las Vegas Valley